Pultney Township is one of the sixteen townships of Belmont County, Ohio, United States. The 2010 census found 8,795 people in the township.

Geography
Located in the eastern part of the county along the Ohio River, it borders the following townships:
Pease Township - north
Mead Township - south
Richland Township - west

West Virginia lies across the Ohio River to the east: Ohio County to the northeast, and Marshall County to the southeast.

Several populated places are located in Pultney Township:
The village of Bellaire in the east, along the Ohio River
Part of the village of Shadyside in the southeast, along the Ohio River
The census-designated place of Neffs in the northwest
The unincorporated community of Blaine in the north
The unincorporated community of Lansing in the north.

Name and history
Pultney Township was organized in 1801.

It is the only Pultney Township statewide.

In 1833, Pultney Township contained one or two stores, four flouring mills, three or four gristmills, several saw mills, and a woolen factory.

Government
The township is governed by a three-member board of trustees, who are elected in November of odd-numbered years to a four-year term beginning on the following January 1. Two are elected in the year after the presidential election and one is elected in the year before it. There is also an elected township fiscal officer, who serves a four-year term beginning on April 1 of the year after the election, which is held in November of the year before the presidential election. Vacancies in the fiscal officership or on the board of trustees are filled by the remaining trustees.

References

External links
County website

Townships in Belmont County, Ohio
Townships in Ohio
1801 establishments in the Northwest Territory